WBG may refer to:

 Warner Bros. Games, an American video game publishing company
 World Bank Group, a family of five international organizations that makes leveraged loans, generally to poor countries
 Wide bandgap, a term associated with semiconductors having electronic band gaps significantly larger than one electron volt
 Wissenschaftliche Buchgesellschaft, a German publishing company
 World Bridge Games, a contract bridge competition event